Wright-Phillips is a surname. Notable people with the surname include:

Shaun Wright-Phillips, English footballer
Bradley Wright-Phillips, English footballer, brother of Shaun
D'Margio Wright-Phillips, English footballer, son of Shaun

See also
Wright (surname)
Phillips (surname)

Compound surnames
English-language surnames
Surnames of English origin